The 2010 Badarwas train collision occurred on 20 September 2010, at Badarwas, Madhya Pradesh, India, when two trains collided with each other. Twenty-three people were reported dead as a result of the accident, and 30 people were reported injured.

Accident 
The accident happened at around 5 A.M. when a freight train rammed the stationary Indore-Gwalior Intercity Express from behind at Badarwas railway station, resulting in the piling up of the last three compartments of the Intercity express on top of one another.

References 

2010 disasters in India
Railway accidents in 2010
Train collisions in India
History of Madhya Pradesh (1947–present)
Disasters in Madhya Pradesh
Railway accidents involving a signal passed at danger
Rail transport in Madhya Pradesh